In English law, contra formam feoffamenti was a writ for a tenant who was infeoffed by the lord's charter to make certain suit and service to his court, and was afterwards distrained for more than was contained therein.

See also
Contra formam collationis
Contributione facienda

References

Writs
English legal terminology
Feudalism in England
English property law
Legal documents with Latin names